George Shields (6 November 1854 – 7 May 1933) was an Australian politician.

He was born in Launceston. In 1923 he was elected to the Tasmanian House of Assembly as a Nationalist member for Bass in a recount following John Hayes' election to the Senate. He was defeated at the next election in 1925. He died in Launceston.

References

1854 births
1933 deaths
Nationalist Party of Australia members of the Parliament of Tasmania
Members of the Tasmanian House of Assembly